Gun Brothers is a 1956 American Western film starring Buster Crabbe and Ann Robinson. It was Crabbe's first feature film in six years.

Plot
Wyoming, 1879: Chad Santee, a former Cavalry sergeant, is a passenger on a stagecoach bound for Cheyenne, along with saloon singer Rose Fargo and a gambler known as Blackjack Silk.

Chad is on his way to see brother Jubal's ranch for the first time. What he doesn't know is that Jubal is among masked outlaws who rob the coach. Chad intends to defend himself, but Blackjack, fearing a gunfight, knocks him cold. Rose takes umbrage, telling the gang about money Blackjack's hiding in his boot. Chad awakens to find Blackjack slapping the woman, so he flattens the gambler with a punch.

A posse forms, led by Yellowstone Kelly, who used to be Chad's army commander. Yellowstone would like Chad to join him in Jackson Hole in the fur-trading business. Chad first hopes to capture the outlaws and retrieve a keepsake brooch of Rose's.

Chad meets an Indian maiden named Meeteetse and treats her kindly, not knowing she's in league with the outlaws. She takes a liking to him. Chad discovers that Jubal's ranch is actually a hideout, with Shawnee Jack the gang's leader. He notices that Meeteetse has the stolen brooch and realizes Jubal is an outlaw. Shawnee now wants Chad dead for knowing too much. Chad promises not to betray his brother and Jubal vouches for Chad's honesty.

The brooch is returned to Rose, but since Chad had possession of it, the law concludes that he must have been among those who stole it. Chad is placed under arrest. After finding out Chad loves Rose and has invited her to go to Jackson Hole with him, Meeteetse makes a deal with the sheriff. She will return the stolen loot if Chad is set free and Rose sent to jail.

Blackjack plans to ambush Chad and is stabbed to death by Meeteetse. After a gunfight, the law realizes who the real robbers are and Chad is allowed to leave. He rides off with Rose to a new life in Jackson Hole, beginning a new trade and a family. Jubal accepts an invitation to join them.

Shawnee Jack bides his time, then rides to Jackson Hole to kill Chad. He is distracted long enough by Jubal to permit Chad and Rose to remain unharmed. Jubal dies saving them, so in his honor, they name their baby girl Jubalee.

Cast

Buster Crabbe as Chad Santee
Ann Robinson as Rose Fargo Santee
Neville Brand as Jubal Santee
Michael Ansara as Shawnee Jack
Walter Sande as Yellowstone Kelly
Lita Milan as Meeteetse
Slim Pickens as Moose MacLain

Production
The film was made by Grand Productions, which was owned by Edward Small.

See also
List of American films of 1956

References

External links

1956 films
1950s English-language films
Films set in 1879
Films set in Wyoming
American black-and-white films
American Western (genre) films
1956 Western (genre) films
Films produced by Edward Small
Films directed by Sidney Salkow
1950s American films
Films with screenplays by Richard Schayer